Phosphuranylite is a uranyl phosphate mineral with formula KCa(H3O)3(UO2)7(PO4)4O4·8(H2O).

It was first described in 1879 by Frederick Augustus Genth, from an occurrence in the Flat Rock pegmatite in Mitchell County, North Carolina, US.

References

Phosphate minerals
Uranium(VI) minerals
Orthorhombic minerals
Minerals in space group 63